The Taipei Twin Towers is a supertall skyscraper development in Taipei, Taiwan. It is located near Taipei Station, Shin Kong Life Tower, and Taipei Bus Station. When the complex is complete, it will be the second tallest building in Taiwan, surpassing the  85 Sky Tower in Kaohsiung, which was completed in 1997. It is estimated to cost NT$60.6 billion (US$1.95 billion).

History
The project was originally designed by Japanese architect Fumihiko Maki for the initial 2005 bid that planned to finish constructing the skyscrapers by 2011. However, it was delayed multiples times due to a series of complication in the bidding process, which was restarted in 2018 again for the sixth time.

In the latest round of bids, two proposals were submitted. In December 2018 the bid submitted by a consortium led by Hong Kong-based Nan Hai Development Ltd and Malaysian property developer Malton Berhad was named the most favored bidder. The skyscrapers were designed by MVRDV in collaboration with CHY Architecture Urban Landscape to revitalise the central station area in the capital's Zhongzheng District and was to be constructed as a pile of blocks, each fronted by screens that will display "major cultural spectacles, sporting events, and advertising", establishing the area as "a Times Square for Taiwan".

In June 2019, the most favored bidder status was revoked by Taiwan's Investment Commission under the Ministry of Economic Affairs due to national security concerns because it found Nan Hai to be Chinese-funded and the majority of its board members hailing from China. The bid was subsequently awarded in December 2019 to the runner-up, a consortium led by Taiwanese computer maker Clevo and its property development affiliate Hongwell Group with designs by American architectural firm Skidmore, Owings & Merrill LLP. The basement of building C1 is the terminus for the Taoyuan Airport MRT.

The construction of the towers officially began on November 11, 2022 with the ground breaking ceremony attended by the Taipei mayor Ko Wen-je.

See also
List of tallest buildings in Taiwan
List of tallest buildings in Taipei
List of tallest buildings in the world
Taipei 101
Tuntex Sky Tower
Shin Kong Life Tower

References

Skyscraper office buildings in Taipei
Twin towers
Buildings and structures under construction in Taiwan
Proposed skyscrapers in Taiwan